Yamawaki is a Japanese surname. Notable people with the surname include:

, Japanese photographer
, Japanese gymnast
, Japanese gymnast

Japanese-language surnames